Fogarasi or Fogarassy is a Hungarian surname that may refer to
Alabert Fogarasi (1891–1959), Hungarian philosopher and politician
János Fogarasi (1801–1878), Hungarian jurist and philologist
Viktor Fogarassy (1911–1989), Austrian merchant and art collector

Hungarian-language surnames